André Pelletier or may refer to:

 André Pelletier (Quebec MLA) (1898–1952), member of the Legislative Assembly of Quebec for Témiscouata
 André Pelletier (MNA) (born 1941), member of the National Assembly of Quebec for Abitibi-Est
 André Pelletier (historian) (born 1937), French scholar of Roman history

See also
 Andrée Pelletier, Canadian actress